The 2002 Women's McWil CourtwallWorld Team Squash Championships were held in Odense, Denmark and took place from October 13 until October 20, 2002.

Results

First round

Pool A

Pool B

Pool C

Pool D

Quarter finals

Semi finals

Third Place Play Off

Final

References

See also 
World Team Squash Championships
World Squash Federation
World Open (squash)

World Squash Championships
2002 in women's squash
Squash tournaments in Denmark
International sports competitions hosted by Denmark
Squash
Women
2002 in Danish women's sport